Toby Marlow (born 12 October 1994) is a British composer, writer, and actor best known for co-creating the international hit musical Six with Lucy Moss. Six received five Olivier Award nominations, including Best New Musical and Outstanding Achievement in Music. Marlow and Moss went on to win the Tony Award for Best Original Score in 2022.

Marlow is also co-creator of Hot Gay Time Machine, a musical comedy cabaret show directed by Lucy Moss, in which he co-stars with Zak Ghazi-Torbati .

Early life and education
Marlow was born on 12 October 1994 to parents Helma and Andrew Marlow and was raised in Henley-on-Thames, England. He has two siblings: an older brother named Jasper and a younger sister named Annabel, who later originated the role of Katherine Howard in Six at the 2017 Edinburgh Fringe Festival. Marlow's mother and maternal grandparents are Jewish. He was a child actor from the ages of 9 to 14, appearing in several films and on TV, including an appearance on ITV’s Marple, in which he played a French boy with glasses. Marlow's father is a professional musician, his grandfather also trained as an actor and his great-grandmother taught speech and drama.

Marlow was educated at Abingdon School from 2008 to 2013, and was a member of the Acorn Music Theatre Company in Henley. He went on to study English at Robinson College at Cambridge University. While at Cambridge, he was very active in the ADC Theatre scene, as both a performer and a composer. According to Lucy Moss, their friendship "solidified" during the 2015 amateur student production of Rent at the ADC Theatre, during which Marlow played the lead character Angel, and Moss was one of the dancers.

Career

Six 

In 2017, Marlow co-composed and co-wrote the musical Six, produced by Kenny Wax. The musical received positive reviews at the 2017 Edinburgh Fringe Festival and went on to be performed in the West End in London. On 28 July 2019, Marlow stepped into the role of Catherine Parr for two sold-out performances at London's Arts Theatre when a cast-wide illness struck and the show required a sixth performer. Marlow, along with his collaborator Lucy Moss, signed with Warner Chappell Music in August 2019. Six began previews on Broadway at the Brooks Atkinson Theatre on 13 February 2020 and was scheduled to open on 12 March 2020. However, the show's opening night was delayed due to the closure of all Broadway theatres because of the COVID-19 pandemic. Previews for the show resumed on 17 September 2021 and the official opening night occurred on 3 October 2021.

On 12 June 2022, Marlow became the first openly non-binary composer–lyricist to win a Tony Award, sharing the Tony Award for Best Original Score for Six with Moss.

Recognition
In 2022, Marlow and Moss were included in Time magazine's Time 100 Next list.

Personal life
Marlow is non-binary and gay. Marlow uses he/him pronouns.

Filmography

See also
 Six (musical)
 Lucy Moss
 List of Old Abingdonians

References

External links

Toby Marlow on creating Six + new projects on YouTube
 Filmography at Fandango
 Shadows in the Sun cast list

1994 births
Living people
People educated at Abingdon School
LGBT composers
LGBT Jews
English gay writers
English gay actors
English gay musicians
British non-binary actors
Non-binary writers
Non-binary musicians
20th-century LGBT people
21st-century LGBT people
Alumni of Robinson College, Cambridge
Tony Award winners